Empire of Two Worlds is the third science fiction novel by Barrington J. Bayley. The main characters are "tankless" inhabitants of a dim and dry colony world who attempt to find a lost gateway back to Earth.

Literary significance and reception
Rhys Hughes said that the novel was "engrossing" but inferior to his contemporary shorter work.

John Clute described Empire of Two Worlds, along with Annihilation Factor and Collision Course, as "variously successful".

References

External links

1972 science fiction novels
Novels by Barrington J. Bayley